Rosemarie Lorenz ( Schmidtke; born 1943/1944) is a retired East German rower. Under her maiden name, she won a silver and a gold medal in the eight event at the European championships of 1967 and 1968, respectively. Under her married name, she won a gold in the eight event at the 1969 European Rowing Championships in Klagenfurt.

She teamed up with Renate Boesler in the double scull and in the East German national championships, they came second in 1967, they placed outside the first three in 1968, and they came second again in 1969.

References

1940s births
Living people
East German female rowers
European Rowing Championships medalists